Praemastus cymothoe is a moth in the subfamily Arctiinae. It was described by Herbert Druce in 1895. It is found in Bolivia and Colombia.

References

Moths described in 1895
Arctiinae